John Hume (1937–2020) was an Irish politician and co-recipient of the 1998 Nobel Peace Prize.

John Hume may also refer to:
Sir John Hume, 2nd Baronet (died 1695), an Irish landowner
John Hume (bishop) (c. 1706–1782), an English bishop
John Hume (priest) (1743–1818), a Dean of the Church of Ireland
John Robert Hume (c. 1781–1857),a Scottish surgeon and physician
John Walter Hulme (1805–1861), the first Chief Justice of Hong Kong
John Frederick Hume (1860–1935), a miner, notary public and political figure in British Columbia
Jock Hume (1885–1962), a Scottish footballer (Aberdeen) 
John Law Hume (1890–1912), a Scottish violinist on the RMS Titanic
John Basil Hume (1893–1974), a British surgeon and lecturer in anatomy
Jon Hume (born 1983), a New Zealand musician
John R. Hume, Scottish architectural historian

See also
John Hulme (disambiguation)
John Home (disambiguation)